Chenar-e Pidenguiyeh (also Romanized as Chenār-e Pīdengū’īyeh; also known as Pīdangū’īyeh and Pīdengū’īyeh) is a village in Saghder Rural District, Jebalbarez District, Jiroft County, Kerman Province, Iran. At the 2006 census, its population was 15, in 5 families.

References 

Populated places in Jiroft County